Frontenac is a former provincial electoral district in the Chaudière-Appalaches region of the province of Quebec, Canada, which elected members to the National Assembly of Quebec.  As of its final election, it included the city of Thetford Mines and the municipality of Disraeli.

It is not to be confused with the pre-1973 Frontenac electoral district located in the Estrie region. Sources differ on whether the pre-1973 and post-1973 Frontenac electoral districts should be considered different or one and the same. The 1966 version of Frontenac and the 1973 version of Frontenac were drastically different but actually had a small overlap of territory around the area of the modern municipality of Adstock.

It was created for the 1973 election, and its final election was in 2008.  It disappeared in the 2012 election and its successor electoral districts were the newly created Lotbinière-Frontenac and Mégantic.

The riding is named after a former governor of New France, Louis de Buade de Frontenac.

Members of the National Assembly
 Henri Lecours, Liberal (1973–1976)
 Gilles Grégoire, Parti Québécois – Independent (1976–1985)
 Roger Lefebvre, Liberal (1985–1998)
 Marc Boulianne, Parti Québécois (1998–2003)
 Laurent Lessard, Liberal (2003–2012)

Election results

 
|Liberal
|Laurent Lessard
|align="right"|11,785
|align="right"|56.71

References

External links
Information
 Elections Quebec

Election results
 Election results (National Assembly)
 Election results (Elections Quebec)

Maps
 2001 map (Flash)
2001–2011 changes (Flash)
1992–2001 changes (Flash)
 Electoral map of Chaudières-Appalaches region (as of 2001)
 Quebec electoral map, 2001

Former provincial electoral districts of Quebec
Thetford Mines